John Thomson Bell (16 June 1895 – 8 August 1974) was an English cricketer. Bell was a right-handed batsman. He was born in Batley, Yorkshire. Between 1921, and 1940, John played for Yorkshire and the Glamorgan county cricket club, and the Welsh national cricket team. Over the course of 184 matches, he scored 8,390, with a batting average of 29.23. 
John died on the 8th of August, 1974, aged 79

References

External links

1895 births
1974 deaths
Cricketers from Batley
English cricketers
Yorkshire cricketers
Glamorgan cricketers
Wales cricketers
English cricket umpires
H. D. G. Leveson Gower's XI cricketers